The 1961 Minnesota Twins season was the 61st in franchise history and its first in Minneapolis–Saint Paul after it transferred from Washington following a six-decade tenure in late October 1960. The maiden edition of the Twins finished 1961 with a record of 70–90, good for seventh place in the American League, which had expanded from eight to ten teams during the 1960–61 offseason.  The Twins played their home games at Metropolitan Stadium, where they set a franchise record for home attendance.

Offseason 
After 60 seasons in Washington, the Senators franchise moved to the Minneapolis–Saint Paul area – or, more precisely, Bloomington, Minnesota – in 1961. In honor of the cities' nickname, "The Twin Cities", the franchise changed the team's name to the Twins. As one of the conditions to allow the team to move, there would be a new Senators franchise in Washington in 1961, an expansion team that joined the league along with the Los Angeles Angels.

Opening Day
The Twins won their first-ever game, when Pedro Ramos shut out the New York Yankees in Yankee Stadium on April 11.  In beating the defending American League champs 6–0, Ramos out-dueled New York ace Whitey Ford, allowing just three hits and a walk.  Ramos drove in two runs with a single himself. Bob Allison hit the first home run in Minnesota big-league history with a solo shot off Ford in the seventh inning, and Reno Bertoia followed with another homer, a two-run blast, an inning later off Ralph Terry. On April 21, the Twins lost their home opener to the expansion team that replaced them in the nation's capital, the second edition of the Senators, 5–3, before 24,606 at Metropolitan Stadium.

Starting lineup, April 11, 1961

Regular season 
The move to Minnesota immediately paid dividends at the turnstiles, where they drew 1,256,723 fans, the third highest total in the American League. The previous year in Washington, the Senators drew just 743,404 fans, worst in the league. However, the team's record went in the other direction, as they dropped from 73–81 and fifth place in 1960 to 70–90 and seventh place under the new 162-game AL schedule.

In early June, after a losing streak that reached eleven games, Twins owner Calvin Griffith directed manager Cookie Lavagetto to take a week-long sabbatical.  Two weeks after his return, Lavagetto was fired by Griffith.  Cookie had been managing the club since the 1957 season.  He was replaced by his first base coach Sam Mele.

In a home Fourth of July double-header against Chicago, the Twins' Julio Bécquer hit a pinch hit grand slam home run that was the first of its kind in major league history—each run was credited to a different Chicago pitcher (Billy Pierce, Russ Kemmerer, Frank Baumann and Warren Hacker).  In the second game, Twins slugger Harmon Killebrew hit an inside-the-park home run—the only one he would hit in his 573-homer career.

Two Twins made the All-Star Game: first baseman Harmon Killebrew (both games) and pitcher Camilo Pascual (second game).

On August 20, pitchers Jack Kralick and Al Schroll each hit a home run against the Los Angeles Angels—the sixth and final pitching duo to do so in the same game.  On September 27, Schroll took a no-hitter into the ninth inning before giving up four runs on two walks and two hits.

Pedro Ramos was the first pitcher to lead the American League in losses for four years in a row.  Both Harmon Killebrew and Bob Allison topped 100 in RBIs, walks and strikeouts.

Harmon Killebrew led the team with 46 home runs, 122 runs batted in, and 94 runs scored. Camilo Pascual led the Twins with 15 wins and a 3.46 ERA. Catcher Earl Battey won his second Gold Glove Award.

Season standings

Record vs. opponents

Notable transactions 
 December 14, 1960: Faye Throneberry was drafted from the Twins by the Los Angeles Angels in the 1960 MLB expansion draft.
 Prior to 1961 season: Jackie Collum was acquired by the Twins from the Los Angeles Dodgers.
 June 1, 1961: Billy Consolo was traded by the Twins to the Milwaukee Braves for Billy Martin.
 June 1, 1961: Reno Bertoia, Paul Giel and a player to be named later were traded by the Twins to the Kansas City Athletics for Bill Tuttle and a player to be named later. The Athletics completed the deal by returning Paul Giel to the Twins in exchange for cash on June 10.

Roster

Player stats

Batting

Starters by position 
Note: Pos = Position; G = Games played; AB = At bats; H = Hits; Avg. = Batting average; HR = Home runs; RBI = Runs batted in

Other batters 
Note: G = Games played; AB = At bats; H = Hits; Avg. = Batting average; HR = Home runs; RBI = Runs batted in

Pitching

Starting pitchers 
Note: G = Games pitched; IP = Innings pitched; W = Wins; L = Losses; ERA = Earned run average; SO = Strikeouts

Other pitchers 
Note: G = Games pitched; IP = Innings pitched; W = Wins; L = Losses; ERA = Earned run average; SO = Strikeouts

Relief pitchers 
Note: G = Games pitched; W = Wins; L = Losses; SV = Saves; ERA = Earned run average; SO = Strikeouts

Farm system 

LEAGUE CHAMPIONS: Wilson

Notes

References 
Player stats from www.baseball-reference.com
Team info from www.baseball-almanac.com

Minnesota Twins seasons
Minn
1961 in sports in Minnesota